Bartonella birtlesii is an oxidase- and catalase-negative bacteria from the genus Bartonella which was isolated from Apodemus.

References

External links
Type strain of Bartonella birtlesii at BacDive -  the Bacterial Diversity Metadatabase

Bartonellaceae
Bacteria described in 2000